Ferazel's Wand is a platform game by Ambrosia Software for Mac OS released in 1999.

Plot
Ferazel is a member of the Habnabit race, tunnel-dwelling creatures skilled in magic. Long have they dwelled in peace, but now they are under assault from a horde of goblins, and there are whispers of a far more foul foe leading the goblins.

The game concentrates more on thinking than fighting enemies — boss fights are often a matter of logically deducing a foe's weakness. Later levels emphasize trap-dodging, and all levels contain secret passages and hidden items. It's an RPG of sorts, but not in the traditional sense, in as much as the player fights arcade-style and gains power by finding magical crystals.

Reception

References

External links 
Ferazel's Wand official page
MacWorld review of Ferazel's Wand
Ferazel's Wand entry of unused media at The Cutting Room Floor
 https://macintoshgarden.org/games/ferazels-wand
 https://www.linkedin.com/in/ben-spees-745a714

Ambrosia Software games
Classic Mac OS games
Classic Mac OS-only games
Platform games
Role-playing video games
Video games developed in the United States